Neocoenyra ypthimoides is a butterfly in the family Nymphalidae. It is found in the Democratic Republic of the Congo, Tanzania, Malawi and Zambia. The habitat consists of deciduous woodland and forest margins at altitudes between 500 and 1,800 meters.

References

Satyrini
Butterflies described in 1894
Butterflies of Africa